Teucrium teucriiflorum is a species of flowering plant in the family Lamiaceae, and is endemic to arid and semi-arid areas of Australia. It is a semi-scandent shrub with many branches, linear to narrow lance-shaped or narrow egg-shaped leaves and creamy-white flowers.

Description
Flowering occurs in most months but mainly from August to November.

Taxonomy
This germander was first formally described in 1883 by Ferdinand von Mueller who gave it the name Spartothamnus teucriiflorus in the Southern Science Record from specimens collected by Hermann Kempe near the Finke River and Ernest Giles between the Murchison and Gascoyne Rivers. In 2016, Stefan Kattari and Yasaman Salmaki changed the name to Teucrium teucriiflorum in the journal Taxon. In 2018, Anthony Bean selected the specimens collected by Kempe as the lectotype. The specific epithet (teucriiflorum), given when the species was considered to be in the genus Spartothamnus, means "Teucrium-leaved".

Distribution and habitat
Teucrium teucriiflorum grows mulga-dominated, arid or semi-arid woodland and shrubland in Western Australia, southern parts of the Northern Territory and northern South Australia.

References

teucriiflorum
Lamiales of Australia
Eudicots of Western Australia
Flora of the Northern Territory
Flora of Queensland
Flora of South Australia
Plants described in 1882
Taxa named by Ferdinand von Mueller